Disco! is a studio album by American rapper Mike. It was released via 10K on June 21, 2021. It has received generally favorable reviews from critics. It peaked at number 98 on the Billboard Top Current Album Sales chart.

Critical reception

At Metacritic, which assigns a weighted average score out of 100 to reviews from mainstream critics, the album received an average score of 79, based on 4 reviews, indicating "generally favorable reviews".

Dylan Green of Pitchfork gave the album an 8.0 out of 10, stating, "It's less a singing-and-dancing, public reclamation of self than it is a silent disco, a reminder that introspection and consistency can break any curse." Tomas Miriti Pacheco of Spin commented that "the progression of both his sorrow and his musical technique can be traced across the album's diverse tracks." Pranav Trewn of Stereogum wrote, "He is a conduit for a broad coalition of voices that speak across the album, taking in their perspectives and reflecting them back out like the disco ball that obscures his face on the cover."

Accolades

Track listing

Charts

References

External links
 Disco! at Bandcamp

2021 albums
Hip hop albums by American artists